Don Haggerty (July 3, 1914 – August 19, 1988) was an American actor of film and television.

Early life and education
Before he began appearing in films in 1947, Haggerty was a Brown University athlete and served in the United States Army from March 1943 to March 1946.

Career
Usually cast as tough policemen or cowboys, Haggerty appeared in films such as Sands of Iwo Jima (1949), The Asphalt Jungle (1951), Angels in the Outfield (1951) and The Narrow Margin. The B-movie actor continued to appear in films until the early 1980s.

Between 1949 and 1955, Haggerty made four guest appearances in the television series The Lone Ranger – twice as outlaws, once as a crooked sheriff and once as a genuine sheriff. From 1954 to 1955, he starred in the syndicated private eye series The Files of Jeffrey Jones. In the 1955–1956 season, Haggerty appeared as the outlaw Sam Bass in an episode of Jim Davis's syndicated Stories of the Century. About this time, he also appeared on CBS in the Reed Hadley legal drama The Public Defender. He played the lead role in the DuMont series The Cases of Eddie Drake (filmed 1949, aired 1952).

In 1956–1957, Haggerty appeared as Sheriff Elder in nine episodes of the syndicated western-themed crime drama State Trooper. He appeared in three episodes of the syndicated western 26 Men. In 1959, he guest starred in Bruce Gordon's NBC docudrama about the Cold War, Behind Closed Doors.

Haggerty appeared 21 times, including 19 in 1955 and 1956, as newspaperman Marsh Murdock in the ABC/Desilu western series The Life and Legend of Wyatt Earp. In 1960, he appeared as Marshal Bill Thompson in the episode "Alibi" on the ABC/Warner Brothers western series Colt .45.

In 1959, Haggerty portrayed Harry Moxton in the episode "No Laughing Matter" of the NBC crime drama Richard Diamond, Private Detective. Also in 1959, he guest starred on the TV western series Bat Masterson as crooked casino owner Jess Porter.

In 1960, Haggerty appeared as Joe Haynes on the TV western Tales of Wells Fargo in the episode "Doc Dawson". Haggerty guest starred in 1960 in the NBC crime drama Dan Raven and the CBS Rawhide episode "Incident of the Silent Web" in the role of Chaney. He also appeared in the NBC western series The Californians and Riverboat.

Haggerty was cast as Joe Wine in the 1961 episode "Alien Entry" of another syndicated series, The Blue Angels. About this time, he guest starred in the episode "The Green Gamblers" of the syndicated crime drama The Brothers Brannagan. He was also cast in 1963 in an episode of the NBC modern western series Redigo. Haggerty appeared as a guest star in My Favorite Martian as Detective Sergeant Seeley in 1964's episode "Uncle Martin's Broadcast" and as a bank guard in 1965's "Hate Me a Little". In 1967, he portrayed a sheriff on Rango in the episode "A Little Mexican Town." He appeared on Bonanza seven times in various roles between 1962 and 1972.

Selected filmography

Back Door to Heaven (1939) – Jail Guard at Desk (uncredited)
USS VD: Ship of Shame (1942) – Ship Officer (uncredited)
The Gangster (1947) – Thug Messenger (uncredited)
Mystery Range (1947) – Deputy Tom Emery
Silent Conflict (1948) – 2nd. Rancher
The Dead Don't Dream (1948) – Deputy Sheriff
Fighting Father Dunne (1948) – Gorilla Blake (uncredited)
Sinister Journey (1948) – Harmon Roberts
Train to Alcatraz (1948) – Billings
Borrowed Trouble (1948) – Lippy
Pitfall (1948) – District Attorney's Man (uncredited)
That Lady in Ermine (1948) – Staff Officer (uncredited)
Angel in Exile (1948) – Deputy Sheriff (uncredited)
The Gentleman from Nowhere (1948) – Bill Cook (uncredited)
False Paradise (1948) – Deal Marden
Command Decision (1948) – Command Officer (uncredited)
Gun Smugglers (1948) – Sheriff Schurslock
Act of Violence (1949) – Policeman (uncredited)
Rustlers (1949) – Rancher #1
El Paso (1949) – Deputy (uncredited)
The Crooked Way (1949) – Hood
Canadian Pacific (1949) – Cagle
King of the Rocket Men (1949, Serial) – Tony Dirken
South of Rio (1949) – Henchman Chuck Bowers
Scene of the Crime (1949) – Detective (uncredited)
Sands of Iwo Jima (1949) – Colonel in Staff Car (uncredited)
Cowboy and the Prizefighter (1949) – Steve Stevenson
Malaya (1949) – Submarine Commander (uncredited)
Gun Smugglers (1949)
The Sundowners (1950) – Sheriff Elmer Gall
The Kid from Texas (1950) – Morgan
Side Street (1950) – Rivers (uncredited)
Dynamite Pass (1950) – Sheriff in Cliffton
The Vanishing Westerner (1950) – Henchman Art
Storm Over Wyoming (1950) – The Marshal
Shadow on the Wall (1950) – Night Duty Physician (uncredited)
The Asphalt Jungle (1950) – Det. Andrews (uncredited)
Armored Car Robbery (1950) – Detective Cuyler
Vigilante Hideout (1950) – Jim Benson
Lonely Heart Bandits (1950) – Dane (uncredited)
Gambling House (1950) – Sharky
Spoilers of the Plains (1951) – Henchman Ben Rix
Cause for Alarm! (1951) – Mr. Russell
Quebec (1951) – Col. Jean Durossac
Fighting Coast Guard (1951) – Marine Captain (uncredited)
Go for Broke! (1951) – Sgt. Wilson I. Culley
That's My Boy (1951) – Tom, Masseur (uncredited)
No Questions Asked (1951) – Mounted Policeman (uncredited)
Rich, Young and Pretty (1951) – Tom, Legionnaire (uncredited)
Rhubarb (1951) – Policeman (uncredited)
The Strip (1951) – Arresting Detective (uncredited)
Angels in the Outfield (1951) – Rube Ronson
The Stooge (1951) – Mr. Winston (uncredited)
Callaway Went Thataway (1951) – Director Don
Sailor Beware (1952) – Lt. Connors (uncredited)
Hoodlum Empire (1952) – Mark Flynn (uncredited)
Bronco Buster (1952) – Dobie Carson
The Narrow Margin (1952) – Det. Wilson (uncredited)
Wild Stallion (1952) – Sgt. Keach
Denver and Rio Grande (1952) – Bob Nelson
Skirts Ahoy! (1952) – Military Police Sergeant (uncredited)
Glory Alley (1952) – Gambler (uncredited)
Roar of the Crowd (1953) – Chuck Baylor
Hannah Lee (1953) – Bill Crashaw
City of Bad Men (1953) – Bob Thrailkill (uncredited)
Take the High Ground! (1953) – Commanding Officer (uncredited)
Combat Squad (1953) – Sgt. Wiley
Jubilee Trail (1954) – New York Detective (uncredited)
Phantom Stallion (1954) – Foreman Gil
Loophole (1954) – Neil Sanford
The Rocket Man (1954) – Officer Mike O'Brien
Return from the Sea (1954) – Tompkins
Naked Alibi (1954) – Matt Matthews
Cry Vengeance (1954) – Lt. Pat Ryan
The Atomic Kid (1954) – Lieutenant (uncredited)
Strategic Air Command (1955) – Major – Patrol Commander (uncredited)
An Annapolis Story (1955) – Lt. Prentiss
The Eternal Sea (1955) – Commander
Air Strike (1955) – Lt. Richard Huggins
I Cover the Underworld (1955) – Prison Guard (uncredited)
The Private War of Major Benson (1955) – Harold Hibler
The Desperate Hours (1955) – Detective (uncredited)
Texas Lady (1955) – Sheriff Herndon
Crashing Las Vegas (1956) – Tony Murlock
Somebody Up There Likes Me (1956) – Leavenworth Prison Guard (uncredited)
Calling Homicide (1956) – Det. Sgt. Mike Duncan
Chain of Evidence (1957) – Sgt. Mike Duncan
Spring Reunion (1957) – Pete (uncredited)
Spoilers of the Forest (1957) – Williams the Ranger (uncredited)
Footsteps in the Night (1957) – Sgt. Mike Duncan
Back from the Dead (1957) – John Mitchell
Jet Pilot (1957) – Sergeant (uncredited)
The Crooked Circle (1957) – Adams
The Sad Sack (1957) – Capt. Ward (uncredited)
Day of the Badman (1958) – Deputy Floyd
Blood Arrow (1958) – Gabe
Cattle Empire (1958) – Ralph Hamilton
The Man Who Died Twice (1958) – Frank
Some Came Running (1958) – Ted Harperspoon (uncredited)
The Gunfight at Dodge City (1959) – Sheriff Jim Regan, Dodge City
Don't Give Up the Ship (1959) – Cmdr. Turner (uncredited)
The Purple Gang (1959) – Minor Role (uncredited)
Bat Masterson (1960) – Gordon Hall
Seven Ways from Sundown (1960) – Dick Durton
Hell Is for Heroes (1962) – Capt. Mace
Papa's Delicate Condition (1963) – Gambler (uncredited)
The Killers (1964) – Mail Truck Driver
My Favorite Martin 1964 episode "Uncle Martin's Broadcast" - Sgt. Seeley
Harlow (1965) – Police Captain (uncredited)
That Funny Feeling (1965) – Policeman #1
The Great Sioux Massacre (1965) – Senator Blaine
The Loved One (1965) – Haggerty
The Night of the Grizzly (1966) – Sam Potts
Skin Game (1971) – Speaker
The Resurrection of Zachary Wheeler (1971) – Jake
Dirty Harry (1971) – Minor Role (uncredited)
Starbird and Sweet William (1973) – Hunter

References

External links 

1914 births
1988 deaths
20th-century American male actors
American male film actors
American male television actors
Brown Bears athletes
Male actors from New York (state)
Male Western (genre) film actors
People from Greater Los Angeles
People from Poughkeepsie, New York
Western (genre) television actors
United States Army personnel